The Old Catholic Church in the Republic of Poland is a Polish Old Catholic church operating in Poland.

Bishops of the Old Catholic Church in Poland 
Superiors of the Old Catholic Church over the years:
 bishop Marek Jan Kordzik (1955-2016)
 archbishop Arthur Wiecinski (b. 1991)

References

1996 in Christianity
Old Catholic denominations
Catholicism in Poland